Shamaiya Iyengar (Shyama Iyengar) popularly known as Anche Shamaiya,  son of varadaraja Iyengar, dewan of Krishna Raja Wadiyar II (varad-rao) and grandson of Vasudeva Iyengar(A great Sanskrit scholar), was the minister of the police and the post office (also served as the intelligence department) during the time of Hyder Ali and Tipu Sultan. He was originally from Sulikunte in Kolar district of Karnataka 
(also known as Sulkunte), near Budikote in Bangarpet. Although it is said he was born in shambonahali or shamaiahhalli after his name sake (source: Mysore State Gazetteer) in the tumkur district, his ancestors had migrated by then to sulikunte(sulakunte) agrahara formerly known as soolikere village in Kolar district from tumkur. Shamaih and his ancestors were also religious gurus to what Lt Col Kirkpatrick refers to as the brinjara people's( most likely the people of the vanniyar caste) and they were influential in defending shamaiah against British allegations.

Shamaiya had met Hyder when he was a young man. He rose to the height of his power when he was appointed as the head of the post office and police which also served many other functions (Anche Guritana) in 1776 (Some historians put this date at 1779) after helping catch a corrupt official in hiding who had run off with significant money from the state treasury who is referred to as tremalrao. It is said he used his agents and network of emissaries to track him down and bring him back to face justice.

He was honoured with an umbrella, medal, pearl necklace, received 5000 varahas as reward and 1000 varahas as allowance from Hyder Ali. Shamaiah enjoyed great success as an all round administrator during the time of Hyder. It was said that shamaiah was so trusted and an important figure that all courtiers except shamaiah were to compulsorily attend Tippoos wedding. Shamaih was left free to look after the affairs of the state even when the most important nobles and administrators were forced to attend the wedding. Shamaih was the only Hindu allowed to wear the mohammeden elite noble green headdresss and ride on a palanquin during the time of Hyder.

Later in Tipu sultan's time an alleged insurrection to overthrow Tipu and re establish the Hindu king was plotted around 1783. Shamaiya was believed to be the leader of the insurrection. Although some sources suggest it was a simple misunderstanding over some lost jewels and money which was given the spin of a coup. Many alleged conspirators were put to death instantly, it is not known why Shamaiya did not suffer the same fate. It is believed that Tipu ordered him to be put in heavy iron's and was occasionally fed on a low diet, flogged publicly with chilli powder applied to his back and later blinded, suspecting political conspiracy. Shamiaya and his brother Rangaiya persisted to their last in denying any involvement in the insurrection. Shamaiya was extremely popular and got along with all communities and all parties so well that Tipu kept him imprisoned instead of executing shamaih.

Tipus Sanad in 1783 mentioning Shamaiah as Anche Shamaiya, to provoke divisions between the tenkalai sect mandyam iyengars and vadakalai parakala mutt members.

Extract from Sannad of Nawab Tippu Sultan Bahadur of

Mysore (15 th September 1783 A.D.).

“The ‘Nirup ’ is addressed to Kuppaiya, Deva- 
sthanada-Sime-Parupatyagar or manager of the department of temples in the State to the system of reciting 
invocatory verses in the temple at Melukote (see above). 
It is stated in this nirup that Anche Shamaiya (an officer 
under Tlpu) was violating the old usage in the temple at 
Melukote regarding the use of invocatory verses and it 
was now ordained that both forms of invocation which 
begin with “Ramanuja-dayapatra” and “Srisailesha-daya- patra” might be used. Further the Parupatyadar was ordered to be fair to both the sects of Vadagalai and Tenkale (which used the above invocations) and to remove the image of Pillai Lokacharya (a saint of the Tenkalai sect) to its original place at Melukote and to take the God in procession to Kesavaswami mantapa and other mantapas and distribute tirtha (sacred water) and prasada consecrated food offered to God during the Tirunakshatra and conduct the services with zeal in the usual manner.”

Around 700 mandyam iyengars of the bharadwaja gotra, including men women and chidren were massacred in large numbers near the same period. They were hung in a tamarind grove near the Sri Ranganathaswamy temple in Srirangapattinam. It is assumed that shamaih and the excuse of a coup was used to persecute a peoples that had resisted the jiYa tax and who had kept their loyayies to their old masters (The wodeyar dynasty)

It is also said that many members of the jeystimalla (jetti) clan of Brahmin wrestlers and athletes were also massacred en masse at the same time. This is due to the threat perception that such Hindu athletes and warriors would be dangerous if a rebellion ever broke out. This community was and is still popularly known as the jetti or the jetti pehelvan community in and around mysore. They can found in their wrestling establishments known as garadi mane in the Mysore region.

Tipus Sanad in 1793 aimed at himiliating shamaiah even further by changing authority of the village his family lived in and handing it over to the parakala matha

The Sanad of Tipu Sultan in 1793 regarding Sulakunte Agrahara is a document that specifies the grant given to the Parakala Matha of Mysore by the ruler. The contents of the Sanad are as follows:

The grant of the village of Sulakunte Agrahara, along with all its rights, revenues, and other benefits, to the Parakala Matha for its maintenance and upkeep.

The grant of the privilege to the Parakala Matha to hold a weekly market in the village, which would provide additional revenue to the Matha.

The grant of the right to construct tanks, canals, and other waterworks in the village, and to use the water thus obtained for agricultural purposes.

The stipulation that the Parakala Matha must pay an annual tribute of 1000 Pagodas to the government.

The requirement that the Parakala Matha must maintain law and order in the village, and ensure that the villagers pay their taxes regularly

Adherents of his family believe that Shamiaya was a victim of political conspiracy planned by Tipu himself or other jealous ministers and may have even involved Mir Sadiq . Some accounts say that Shamaiya was killed in 1784 but lieutenant colonel Grants' memoir indicates he was still alive in 1806.

According to the "Mysore Gazetteer: Volume IV" by J.H. Elliot and W.H. Moreland, Shamaiah was arrested along with several other officials after the fall of Srirangapatna to the British forces in 1799. He was accused of conspiring against the British and was put on trial. During the trial, it was alleged that Shamaiah had supported Tipu Sultan's efforts to drive the British out of India and had also been involved in an assassination plot against British officers. However, the evidence against him was not considered strong enough to prove his guilt beyond doubt. Despite this, Shamaiah was found guilty and sentenced to life imprisonment in the Andaman Islands. However, it is believed that he was later pardoned and allowed to return to Mysore, where he lived out the rest of his life. The exact details of his trial are not known beyond what is mentioned in the Mysore Gazetteer.

Shamaiya's elder brother Ranga Iyengar was also a highly placed officer under Tipu. His younger brother Aprameya was also given a position in the government.

He is also referred to as anche shamaiah, inchiwalla, anchewalla, shamia in many records. Rangaiah has been referred to as Bungea, rungea in many records.

a contemporary of shamaiah says this regarding the imprisonment and torture of Shamaiah hy Tipoo:

"Shamaiah, who had been imprisoned and tortured for the supposed concealment of treasure, and whose life was only spared at the intercession of the vakeels, or ambassadors, of the English Company, was, on the departure of the Sultan, set at liberty."

Lieutent colonel william kirkpatrick also talked about the various qualities of shamaiah:

"Shamaiah, an Iyengar Bramin, of very superior abilities, was the author of several learned works, and among others, of a complete commentary on the Vedanta Sutra, one of the most abstruse and difficult of the Hindu sciences. The Sultan was much attached to him, and employed him on all occasions which required great skill and judgment, in political as well as religious matters."

"Shamaiah, a celebrated Brahman minister of the last reign, possessed of great talents and acquirements, was appointed Dewan, or prime minister."

"This account of the appointment of a Brahman to the prime ministerial office in the Mysore Government is singular, and speaks highly of the merit and influence of Shamaiah, who is said to have enjoyed the complete confidence of Hyder Ali, and to have been the first native who was allowed to wear a green turban, which had been reserved exclusively for Mussulman nobles."

"Shamaiah was a man of high birth and had received a liberal education, and his talents were of the first order."

"In Shamaiah's papers were found, after his death, letters and papers of Hyder and Tippoo, which evinced the highest opinion entertained by these princes of his ability and integrity."

"It is not the least extraordinary feature in the history of Shamaiah, that he should have been able to preserve the favor and friendship of Hyder and Tippoo for so many years; a fact which speaks highly of his political wisdom and fidelity."

"The character of Shamaiah, as given by the natives, was that of a Brahman of great learning and probity."

Overall, Kirkpatrick holds Shamaiah Iyengar in high esteem and portrays him as an exceptionally talented and intelligent minister who earned the respect and trust of the ruling princes of Mysore

William Kirkpatrick mentions the following works by Shamaiah Iyengar:

"An historical account of the principal circumstances attending the reign of Haidar Aly and Tippoo Sultan" (in English)

"Sulabhāna nighantu" (in Sanskrit)

"Rasendra chintamani" (in Sanskrit)

He also notes that Shamaiah was the author of several other works, but does not provide their titles.

Nobody knows the contents of these books. Or even if any copy of them survived anywhere.

"Shamia Saheb, a minister of Tippoo's, was employed by him to translate certain English works into the Canarese and Persian languages, and was much esteemed by that Prince for his literary abilities." (Source: "An Account of the Kingdom of Mysore" by William Kirkpatrick, page 379)

"Shamaiah Sahib, who was distinguished by the titles of Rajah and Musnavy, had written many poems and songs, and had been much patronised by the former Sultauns, as well as by Hyder Ali and his son, by both of whom he was much esteemed."

"Shamaiah wore a green turban, which was considered a mark of distinction among the Mahomedans; and he was considered to be so great a favourite with Hyder and Tippoo, that they frequently seated him beside them on their musnuds, or thrones." (Chapter 14, p. 238)

He was such a famous part of Mysore between 1770s and 1799 that many English, Muslim and Mysore wadiyar commissioned historians have mentioned him in many books. He was in touch with the British, Persians and French. He was a man of great character but ultimately He was a victim of circumstances of his time. Left blinded by Tipus torture and sidelined by the British, he was a victim of the circumstances of his time. The British also used him in 1799 after the death of Tipu in a fake trial to scare many influential people within Mysore. First they gave him the death penalty, then commuted it to life in prison in the Andamans but was never taken there. He probably livef the rest of his days in mysore. He was a man loved by all communities including the mohemmedans. He owned large lands including most of tumkur but British confiscated the lands after the fall of Tipu in 1799.

He was probably born near the mid-1700s and died somewhere near 1820s. He is survived by many descendents. Although a lot of property was confiscated from Shamaiah, he still had a good amount of property to his name and his descendents were large landowners with one of his descendents of the same name "(Su) shyama Iyengar" living in the late 1800s and early 1900s was only one of two tax payers to pay more than 1000 rupees in land tax in the entire kolar district.

Overall Shamaih was a highly intelligent and capable administrator and leader who was able to handle everything from diplomacy to internal affairs to warfare. He was man well respected by all including Hyder and Tipu, the British and even the French. He was a scholar and a master accountant. Despite all this he was a victim of the circumstances of his time in a very exited and chaotic political time.

References

Politicians from Bangalore
Year of birth missing
Year of death missing